Maulvi Ahmad Shah Din Dost is an Afghan Taliban politician and commander who is currently serving as Governor of Ghor province since November 2021.

References

Living people
Year of birth missing (living people)
Taliban governors
Governors of Ghor Province
Taliban commanders